Steve Maloney may refer to:

Steve Maloney, bassist for the band The Blood Divine.
Stephen Maloney, Australian tennis player